Amaretti di Saronno (singular amaretto di Saronno) refer to a type of amaretto, a bitter-sweet flavored macaron, that is traditional to Saronno, a comune of Lombardy, Italy. It is one of many types of traditional amaretti, but the only one made with apricot kernels (the others are usually made with almonds).

The Amaretti di Saronno are widely available commercially, most notably through the brand Lazzaroni. Amaretti di Saronno are unrelated to Amaretto liqueur, which is produced by two other companies based in Saronno - ILLVA and PLF.

Legend
The invention of this amaretto has received an amorous Renaissance treatment. In the early 18th century, a Milanese bishop or cardinal surprised the town of Saronno with a visit. A young couple, residents of the town, welcomed him and paid tribute with an original confection: on the spur of the moment, they had baked biscuits made of sugar, egg whites, and crushed apricot kernels. These so pleased the visiting bishop that he blessed the two with a happy and lifelong marriage, resulting in the preservation of the secret recipe over many generations.

References

See also
Amaretto (disambiguation)

Italian desserts
Almond cookies